Horacio José López Salgado (born 15 September 1948) is a Mexican former football forward, who played for the Mexico national team between 1968 and 1980, gaining 50 caps and scoring 13 goals. He was part of the Mexico squad for the 1970 World Cup.

At club level, López played for América, Cruz Azul and Necaxa

References

External links
 
 

1948 births
Association football forwards
Mexico international footballers
Footballers from Guerrero
People from Taxco
1970 FIFA World Cup players
Club Necaxa footballers
Cruz Azul footballers
Club América footballers
Liga MX players
Living people
Mexican footballers